A Web of Air is a young adult post-apocalyptic science fiction novel by British writer Philip Reeve. It is the second book in the Fever Crumb series, a prequel series to the Mortal Engines Quartet. It was published on 5 April 2010.

Synopsis
The clever young engineer, Fever Crumb, is swept up in a race to build a flying machine. Her mysterious companion is a boy who talks to Angels. Powerful enemies will kill to possess their new technology-or to destroy it.

A Web of Air is the sequel to Fever Crumb, the story set centuries before Mortal Engines that tells how great cities begin to build giant engines to make their first predatory journeys across the wastelands. It is set in Mayda, a city established in an atomic bomb crater off of mainland Portugal.

Reception 
On Goodreads, the book has a 3.9 out of 5.

Kirkus Reviews called the book "Imaginative, inventive and exciting."

References

External links
Philip Reeve FAQs

Mortal Engines
2010 British novels
Novels by Philip Reeve
Children's science fiction novels
2010 science fiction novels
British children's novels
British science fiction novels
British steampunk novels
Predator Cities
Aviation novels
2010 children's books
Scholastic Corporation books